Fighting for Voltage is the debut full-length album by Canadian Cyberpunk/Industrial metal band Left Spine Down. The album was released on April 22, 2008 via Synthetic Sounds in Canada and on September 23, 2008 in the USA via Bit Riot Records.

Track listing

References

External links
Left Spine Down Official Site
Synthetic Sounds Official Site
Fighting for Voltage on Amazon.ca
Fighting for Voltage on Amazon MP3 Store

2008 debut albums
Left Spine Down albums